The white-striped woodcreeper (Lepidocolaptes leucogaster) is a species of bird in the Dendrocolaptinae subfamily. It is endemic to Mexico.

Its natural habitats are subtropical or tropical dry forests and subtropical or tropical moist montane forests.

References

white-striped woodcreeper
Endemic birds of Mexico
white-striped woodcreeper
Taxonomy articles created by Polbot
Birds of the Sierra Madre Occidental
Birds of the Sierra Madre del Sur
Birds of the Trans-Mexican Volcanic Belt